Surayhin (also spelled Serihin) is a village in northwestern Syria, administratively part of the Hama Governorate, southeast of Hama. Nearby localities include al-Jajiyah to the north, al-Jinan to the southeast, al-Buraq to the south, Maarin al-Jabal to the southwest and al-Khalidiyah to the west. According to the Central Bureau of Statistics, Surayhin had a population of 7,466 in the 2004 census. Its inhabitants are predominantly Sunni Muslims.

References

Bibliography

 

Populated places in Hama District